The 2008–09 VCU Rams men's basketball team represented Virginia Commonwealth University during the 2008–09 college basketball season. The Rams compete in the Colonial Athletic Association and played their home games at Stuart C. Siegel Center. They finished the season 24–10, 14–4 and won the 2009 CAA tournament against George Mason. The Rams lost in the first round of the 2009 NCAA tournament to UCLA by one point.

Schedule 

|-
!colspan=8 style=| Exhibition

|-
!colspan=8 style=| Regular season

|-
!colspan=10 style=| CAA tournament

|-
!colspan=10 style=| NCAA tournament

References

VCU
VCU Rams men's basketball seasons
VCU
VCU Rams
VCU Rams